Holger Höglund (31 May 1906 – 23 March 1965) was a Swedish film actor. He appeared in 28 films between 1942 and 1963.

Selected filmography
 Crisis (1946)
 Private Karlsson on Leave (1947)
 Bohus Battalion (1949)
 Knockout at the Breakfast Club (1950)
 The Green Lift (1952)
 Åsa-Nisse on Holiday (1953)
 Speed Fever (1953)
 Laugh Bomb (1954)

References

External links

1906 births
1965 deaths
Swedish male film actors
20th-century Swedish male actors